Scott Gammer (born 24 October 1976) is a Welsh former professional boxer who competed from 2002 to 2009. He held the British heavyweight title from 2006 to 2007 and challenged once for the lesser European Union heavyweight title in 2008.

Biography

Professional career
Gammer turned professional in 2002 and is currently trained by his father Ralph Gammer and managed by Paul Boyce.

On 16 June 2006, after 16 professional fights undefeated, he earned the right to challenge Mark Krence for the British Heavyweight Title. Gammer won in the 9th round via TKO.

In his first defence of the title on 13 October 2006 he defeated Micky Steeds by a unanimous points decision. Steeds was brought in as a replacement for Danny Williams, who was the mandatory challenger for the British Heavyweight Championship at the time, however he pulled out of the fight due to the date coinciding with Ramadan.

A second title defence against Williams was originally scheduled for 9 February 2007, however the fight was re-arranged due to Williams' defeat by Audley Harrison on 9 December 2006. Gammer finally fought Williams on 2 March 2007 at the Neath Sports Centre, Glamorgan. Williams won the bout by 9th-round KO, giving Gammer his first ever defeat as a professional.

Gammer had an opportunity to fight for the British title once again when he boxed John McDermott later that year in an elimination bout. The contest took place in Sheffield but ended up with another defeat for the Welshman. Following this setback Gammer announced his retirement from boxing and McDermott went on to challenge for the title. The retirement did not last that long however as Gammer returned to action in August 2008 when he challenged Francesco Pianeta for the EU Heavyweight championship in Germany. The fight ended with another defeat for Gammer, although this time it was due to a corner retirement when Gammer broke his hand in the 2nd round. Despite the injury Gammer fought bravely and looked good throughout until the handicap became too much and his corner pulled him out. Gammer fought twice in 2009. In May he was knocked out by unbeaten Finnish prospect Robert Helenius. In October he entered the Prizefighter tournament and was beaten in his quarter final match against Coleman Barrett, who went on to reach the final.

Professional boxing record

References

External links
 

1976 births
Living people
People from Pembroke, Pembrokeshire
Sportspeople from Pembrokeshire
Welsh male boxers
Heavyweight boxers
Prizefighter contestants